County of Malmesbury was one of the five counties in the Northern Territory which are part of the Lands administrative divisions of Australia. 
 
This County, in the Daly River area, lapsed with the passage in 1976 and assent of the Crown Lands Ordinance 1976 (No 1 of 1977) and the Crown Lands (Validation of Proclamations) Ordinance 1976 (No.2 of 1977).

Description 
The County was named after James H. Harris, 3rd Earl of Malmesbury (1807 - 1889)  Foreign Secretary under Lord Derby in 1852. The South Australian administration named the Counties of Malmesbury and Rosebery on 16 July 1885  at a time when these two statesmen were prominent in the British Parliament and early developments were occurring on the Daly River and in the Pine Creek mining area of the Territory.

Constituent hundreds

Hundred of Berinka
The Hundred of Berinka was gazetted in July 1885 and was extended in October 1913.

Hundred of Hawkshaw
The Hundred of Hawkshaw was gazetted on 16 July 1885 and was extended in October 1913.  The Hundred was roughly  ten miles by ten miles in keeping with the colonial policy of forming 100 square mile units.

References

Counties of the Northern Territory